Katolički Školski Centar "Sveti Franjo", commonly abbreviated as KŠC Sv.Franjo, is a school founded by the nuns of the Daughters of Divine Charity in Tuzla, Bosnia and Herzegovina.

History 
The school was founded in 1883. According to records and testimony, the school's functions were well organized, and the quality of education was very good. After the Communists came to power following the Second World War, such schools were closed and their property confiscated.

KŠC Tuzla was re-established in 1997 by the Roman Catholic Archdiocese of Vrhbosna.

High school 
The High School started operating on November 6, 1995, in the premises of the Elementary School Pazar in Tuzla with 102 students divided into four classes. After two years of work, in 1997 the school moved to the High School of Mechanical Engineering. Classes were held at the Mechanical School until the fall of 2001, when it moved to its own building.

Elementary school 
The elementary school started operating in 2001.

References

External links
Official website

1883 establishments in Austria-Hungary
1997 establishments in Bosnia and Herzegovina
Educational institutions established in 1883
Educational institutions established in 1997
Schools in Bosnia and Herzegovina

Buildings and structures in Tuzla
Education in Tuzla